Van den Bosch is a Dutch toponymic surname, originally indicating either an association with a forest ("bosch", modern Dutch "bos"), with a place/dwelling named "Den Bosch" or with the city Den Bosch. In the Netherlands about 10,200 carried the name in 2007, while in Belgium 3,755 people were named Van Den Bosch and another 3,164 were named Vandenbosch, Vandebosch or Vanden Bosch in 2008. Other variant spellings are Van der Bosch and Van den Bos.

People with this surname include:
 Antal van den Bosch (born 1969), Dutch language researcher
 Dirk van den Bosch (1906–1994), Dutch sports shooter
  (1789-1851), Dutch admiral and Minister of Colonies
 François Van Den Bosch (born 1934), Belgian cyclist
 Hippolyte Van den Bosch (1926-2011), Belgian footballer
 Jean Van Den Bosch (1898-1985), Belgian cyclist
 Jean van den Bosch (1910-1985), Belgian diplomat
 Jean Van den Bosch, guitarist and vocalist of The Vipers Skiffle Group
 Johannes van den Bosch (1780-1844), Dutch Minister of State and Governor-General of the Dutch East Indies
 Johannes van den Bosch (1906-1994), Dutch chess player
 Johannes Adrianus van den Bosch (1813-1870), Dutch officer and politician; Minister of War from 1866 to 1868
 Kyle Vanden Bosch (b. 1978), American football player
 Linde van den Bosch (b. 1963), Dutch linguist 
 Monique van den Bosch (b. 1964), Dutch wheelchair tennis player
 Pieter van den Bosch (1612–1673), Dutch painter
 Pieter Van den Bosch (1927-2009), Belgian footballer
 Rinus van den Bosch (1938-1996), Dutch artist
 Roelof Benjamin van den Bosch (1810-1862), Dutch botanist
 Tjalling van den Bosch (b. 1958), Dutch strongman
  (b. 1985), Belgian cyclo-cross racer
Van der Bosch
 Peter van der Bosch (1686-1736), Flemish Jesuit hagiographer
Vandebosch
Ingrid Vandebosch (b. 1970), Belgian model

See also
 Van den Bos, Dutch surname
 Van den Bossche, Flemish surname
 Van den Bosch (noble family), Dutch noble family
 Bosch (surname), both a Dutch and Catalan surname.
 Fort van den Bosch a fort on Java named after Governor General Johannes van den Bosch
 Vandenboschia, fern genus named after Roelof Benjamin van den Bosch

References

Dutch-language surnames
Dutch toponymic surnames